The 2012 U-20 Copa Libertadores (known as the 2012 Copa Movistar Libertadores Sub-20 for sponsorship reasons) was the second edition of this U-20 club competition. Players born on or after 1 January 1992 were eligible to compete. The tournament was played in Lima, Peru.

Venues
All games were played in Lima at the Estadio Monumental and Estadio Alejandro Villanueva.

Qualification
In addition to the three clubs of the host nation, nine clubs qualified from the remaining nine football associations of CONMEBOL. Also, one team from the Mexican Football Federation and one from the Spanish Football Federation.

Referees
A referee and an assistant referee from each federation along with two referees and four assistant referee from the host country where chosen for the tournament.

|}

Group stage
The winners and runners-up from each group advanced to the quarterfinals.

All kick-off times are local (UTC−05:00).

Group A

Group B

Group C

Group D

Knockout phase
No extra time, if two teams tied after 90 minutes then there is a penalty shoot-out.

Quarterfinals

Semifinals

Third-place match

Final

Final standings

Scorers

5 goals
 Ramsés Bustos (Unión Española)
 Martín Zúñiga (América)
 Rodrigo Gattas (Unión Española)
4 goals
 Juan Cazares (River Plate)
 Junior Ponce (Alianza Lima)
3 goals
 Rodrigo Cuba(Alianza Lima)
 Grabiel Guerra (Boca Juniors)
2 goals
 Luis Vila (River Plate)
 Cristhian Gutierrez Almeida (Defensor Sporting)
 Paulinho (Corinthians)
 Patrick (América (MG))
 Abdelkader Oueslati (Atlético Madrid)
 Diego Bejarano (Universitario)
 Christian Adrianzén (Sporting Cristal)
 Augusto Solari (River Plate)
 Giorgian De Arrascaeta (Defensor Sporting)
1 goal
 Ezequiel Aguirre (River Plate)
 Daniel Denot (River Plate)
 Rodineo (Corinthians)
 Jean Natal (Corinthians)
 Michael (Corinthians)
 Fernando (Corinthians)
 Edilson (Corinthians)
 Jhon Pírez (Defensor Sporting)
 Federico Platero (Defensor Sporting)

1 goal
 Juan M. Fernández Otero (Defensor Sporting)
 Abian Serrano (Atlético Madrid)
 Domenech Fernandez (Atlético Madrid)
 Soares (America (MG))
 Anderson (America (MG))
 Elivelton Silas (America (MG))
 Oscar Romero (Cerro Porteño)
 Epifano Garcia (Cerro Porteño)
 Diego Godoy (Cerro Porteño)
 Miguel Almiron (Cerro Porteño)
 César Serna (Cerro Porteño)
 Jorge Valbuena (Cerro Porteño)
 Miguel Mesta (Alianza Lima)
 Wilder Cartagena (Alianza Lima)
 Gil Cordero Burgos (América)
 José Jiménez (Real Esppor)
 Mariano Suárez (Boca Juniors)
 Franco Fragapane (Boca Juniors)
 Sebastian Palacios (Boca Juniors)
 Junior Sornoza (Independiente José Terán)
 Wilson A. Morales Silva (Independiente José Terán)
 Gustavo A. Asprillas (Independiente Jose Teran)
 José Arnillas (Universitario)
 Mauricio López (Universitario)
 Johan Rey (Universitario)
 Mario Tajima (Universitario)
 Rodrigo Camino (Universitario)
 Denis Pinto (Blooming)
 Norvey Orosco (Junior)
 Leiner Escalante (Junior)
 Sergio L. Martinez (Junior)
|}

References

External links
 2nd U-20 Copa Libertadores: River Plate champion in the juveniles´ festival Conmebol magazine, July–August 2012, pp. 63–67

U-20 Copa Libertadores
U-20
U-20 Copa Libertadores
U-20 Copa Libertadores
Copa Libertadores